Chameleon is the seventh studio album from Swedish singer Måns Zelmerlöw. It was released on 2 December 2016 through Warner Music Sweden. The album includes the singles "Fire in the Rain", "Hanging on to Nothing" and "Glorious". The album peaked at number 6 on the Swedish Albums Chart. The album was produced by Phil Cook, Jez Ashurst, The Family, Moh Denebi, Nicki Adamsson, Fredrik Sonefors and Isac Hördegård.

Background
On 8 November 2016, Måns announced on Facebook that he would be releasing his new album Chameleon on 2 December 2016 and the third single "Glorious" would be released on 24 November 2016. On 1 December 2016 he announced that he written the album in Bath, Copenhagen and South Africa, he also said "A HUGE thank you to everyone who's been involved and most of all thank you to all #månsters out there for your incredible support".

Commercial performance
On 9 December 2016, the album entered the Swedish Albums Chart at number 6, making it Zelmerlöw's fifth top 10 album in Sweden. It dropped off the chart the following week. On 10 December 2016 the album entered the Belgian Flemish Albums Chart at number 159.

Singles
"Fire in the Rain" was released as the lead single from the re-issued version of Zelmerlöw's sixth studio album Perfectly Damaged on 4 May 2016, but the song was also released as the lead single from Chameleon. "Hanging on to Nothing" was released as the second single from the album on 26 August 2016. The song did not enter the Swedish Singles Chart, but peaked to number 2 on the Sweden Heatseeker Songs. "Glorious" was released as the third single from the album on 24 November 2016. The song did not enter the Swedish Singles Chart, but peaked to number 17 on the Sweden Heatseeker Songs. "Happyland" was released as the fourth single from the album on 2 February 2018.

Track listing

Charts

Release history

References

2016 albums
Måns Zelmerlöw albums
Warner Music Sweden albums